3x3 basketball was featured in the Asian Indoor Games and the Asian Indoor and Martial Arts Games official programme in 2009, and since 2017. The inaugural staging of 3x3 basketball was seen in 2007, as a demonstration sport. The programme includes 2 events (men and women).  The FIBA and FIBA Asia are the world and continental respectively governing body.

Editions
There are four Asian Indoor Games and Asian Indoor and Martial Arts Games that 3x3 basketball competed, as both an official programme and a demonstration sport.

Men's tournaments

Participating nations

Women's tournaments

Participating nations

References

External links
Basketball 3X3 (Olympic Council of Asia) 
FIBA 
FIBA Asia

Asian Indoor and Martial Arts Games
Sports at the Asian Indoor and Martial Arts Games
Basketball in Asia